H. brevirostris  may refer to:
 Hippocampus brevirostris, a synonym for Hippocampus hippocampus, the short-snouted seahorse, a seahorse species endemic to the Mediterranean Sea and parts of the North Atlantic, particularly around Italy and the Canary Islands
 Hyaenodon brevirostris, an extinct mammal species

See also